C.A. Kincaid CVO (1870–1954) co-authored with Dattatray Balwant Parasnis, the History of the Maratha People in three volumes. Higher in command requested that the book not be published because of its favorable portrayal of some Indian figures. He was a high court judge in colonial India and a prolific author. He was educated at Sherborne.

His son, Dennis Kincaid, was also a civil servant, author of two novels and the historical study British Social Life in India, 1608–1937.

References

 Kincaid Clan history
 History of the Maratha People Vol1 Vol2 Vol3

Further reading

External links

 
 

Historians of India
British India judges
1870 births
1954 deaths
People educated at Sherborne School
Commanders of the Royal Victorian Order
20th-century Scottish historians